Death Notice, previously known as Death Notify, is a 2022 Hong Kong action thriller film directed by Herman Yau and starring Louis Koo, Julian Cheung and Francis Ng. Based on the Chinese novel of the same title by Zhou Haohui, production for the film began in April 2018.

Originally set for theatrical release on 9 December 2021 in Hong Kong, the film's release was postponed to 31 March 2022.

Plot
In Hong Kong, a vigilante serial killer by the name of Darker leaves death notices stating when and how he will murder a victim. Even if the victim reports it to the police and receives protection, Darker can easily break through and execute them.

Ten years ago, Darker orchestrated a mysterious explosion of Mang Wan, the girlfriend of police inspector Law Fei, with the only survivor and witness being Wong Siu-ping, a homeless man who was disabled and his face severely burnt and disfigured as a result. Darker reappears again in the present sending out death notices and executing violent and brutal punishments, challenging the police to a face off with an unimaginable conspiracy behind.

In response, the police set up a special task force led by Chief Superintendent Hon Ho, where Law is also a member of. Hon and Law collaborates with Wong to for further clues, but they are always fail in every operation and cannot save the victims. Law, whose is skilled in observation and analysis, is able to predict Darker's execution plan every time, but is always a step too late. As each execution occurs, Law starts to notice the hidden secrets behind where Darker's true identity is gradually revealed.

Cast
Louis Koo as Wong Siu-ping (黃少平), a homeless man who is the sole survivor of an explosion executed by Darker a decade ago and became disabled and disfigured as a result.
Julian Cheung as Law Fei (羅飛), a police inspector of the New Territories South region and a prodigy of criminal physiology.
Francis Ng as Hon Ho (韓灝), chief superintendent of the Kowloon East region and captain of the special task force.
Myolie Wu as Mang Wan (孟芸), Law's girlfriend.
Chrissie Chau as Leung Yam (梁音), senior inspector of the Identification Bureau.
Charmaine Sheh as Hon Siu-hung (韓少虹), a politician who is one of Darker's murder targets.
Simon Yam as Officer Tsang (曾Sir), Feputy Commissioner of Police.
Ray Lui as Tang Wah (鄧驊), chairman of Kong Ho Corporation (江河集團) who is one of Darker's murder targets.
Philip Keung
Danny Chan
Timmy Hung
Ruby Lam
Babyjohn Choi 
Justin Cheung 
Raymond Chiu
6-Wing
Law Lan
Waise Lee
Kenny Wong
Ben Ng
May Law
Catherine Chau
Cheung Kwok-keung
Deno Cheung
David Siu
Tony Ho

Production

Development
The project was first announced at the 2016 Hong Kong Filmart as a film adaptation of the Chinese novel, Death Notice by Zhou Haohui. The film was slated to begin production during the same year with a budget of ¥100 million (US$16 million) and Philip Yung attached as director. On 6 April of the same year, it was reported that the film will star Aaron Kwok, Louis Koo and Julian Cheung.

News for the project did not surface until Zhao Haohui posted on his Sina Weibo in February 2018 stating a film adaptation of his novel will begin shooting in July of the same year with Koo, Cheung and Francis Ng confirmed to star. The project was later promoted at the 2018 Hong Kong Filmart on 21 March, where it was attended by director Herman Yau, cast members Koo, Ng, Cheung, Chau, Myolie Wu and Justin Cheung.

Filming
Filming for Death Notice began in April 2018. On 16 April at 6:00 AM, filming of a firearm shootout scene took place in an apartment building in Sham Shui Po with cast members Ng, Cheung, Wu and Babyjohn Choi. However, at 11:00 AM, an object at the back stairs of the building caught on fire, and the entire cast and crew, along with residents of the apartment, had to evacuate. Filming resumed at the location 13 minutes after firefighters put out the fire before shooting ended at 6:00PM.

On 2 May 2018, filming took place at the Lei Yue Mun Park and Holiday Village, where the film's production start ceremony was also held with director Yau and cast members Koo, Ng, Cheung, Wu, Chrissie Chau, Timmy Hung, 6-Wing, Justin Cheung, Babyjohn Choi and Tony Hung present. There, Koo also revealed that he will be portraying four roles in the film, for which he will be wearing different makeup for each of them that requires four to five hours to put on.

Release
Death Notice was originally set to be theatrically released in Hong Kong on 9 December 2021, but it was later pushed back to 31 March 2022, with "marketing correction" being cited for the reason.

References

2022 films
2022 action thriller films
Hong Kong action thriller films
Police detective films
Hong Kong vigilante films
Hong Kong serial killer films
Cantonese-language films
Media Asia films
Films directed by Herman Yau
Films based on thriller novels
Films based on mystery novels
Films based on Chinese novels
Films set in Hong Kong
Films shot in Hong Kong